Quality mark may refer to:

Certification mark
State quality mark of the USSR